Norsabrina binti Mohd. Noor is a Malaysian politician and formerly served as Kedah State Executive Councillor.

Election Results

Honours
  :
  Knight Companion of the Order of Loyalty to the Royal House of Kedah (DSDK) – Dato' (2015)

References

United Malays National Organisation politicians
Members of the Kedah State Legislative Assembly
Kedah state executive councillors
21st-century Malaysian politicians
Living people
People from Kedah
Malaysian people of Malay descent
Malaysian Muslims
1979 births